Tāj al-Dīn Abū'l-Faḍl Aḥmad ibn Muḥammad ibn ʿAbd al-Karīm ibn Abd al-Rahman ibn Abdullah ibn Ahmad ibn Isa ibn Hussein ibn ʿAṭā Allāh al-Judhami al-Iskandarī al-Shādhilī was an Egyptian Malikite jurist, muhaddith and the third murshid (spiritual "guide" or "master") of the Shadhili Sufi order.

Life and work
He was born in Alexandria and taught at both the al-Azhar Mosque and the Mansuriyyah madrasa in Cairo. He was responsible for systematizing Shādhilī doctrines and recording the biographies of the order's founder, Abu-l-Hassan ash-Shadhili, and his successor, Abu al-Abbas al-Mursi. He is credited with having authored the first systematic treatise on dhikr, The Key to Salvation (Miftāḥ al-Falāḥ), but is mostly known for his compilation of aphorisms, the Ḥikam al-ʿAtā‘iyya.

Ibn ʿAṭā Allāh was one of those who confronted the controversial theologian Ibn Taymiyya, who was jailed several times for his views on religious issues and for his perceived excesses in attacking the Sufis. His confrontations with Ibn Taymiyya saw Ibn ʿAṭā Allāh leading a procession of some 200 Sufis against Ibn Taymiyya as well as confronting him on issues.

Death and legacy
He died in 1309 while in Cairo.

The wide circulation of Ibn ʿAṭā Allāh's written works led to the spread of the Shādhilī order in North Africa, where the order's founder had been rejected in earlier attempts. The Wafai Sufi order was also derived from his works. Over the past 700 years the teachings of Ibn ‘Ata’ Allah have been repeatedly studied, commented on, reiterated, and have spread to the point where they are available across the globe, having been translated into almost every major language.

Commentaries on the Ḥikam have been made by some of the most famous masters of the Shadhili order such as Ibn Abbad al-Rundi, Ahmad Zarruq and Ahmad ibn Ajiba as well as non-Shadhilis like the Indian Chishti Sufi ʿAbd Allah Gangohi and the Syrian Islamic law Professor Sa'id Ramadan al-Bouti. A modern English translation of Ḥikam by Muhammed Nafih Wafy was published under the title "The Book of Aphorism" by Islamic Book Trust in Malaysia in 2010.

References

External links
Hikam (maxims or aphorisms), partially translated here by Ayesha Bewley. 
 https://www.amazon.com/Book-Aphorism-Ibn-Ataillah/dp/B007PYD088
 Commentary by Ibn Abbad in English.
 Hikam in English and Arabic PDFs, and links to audio recordings.
The Key to Salvation: A Sufi Manual of Invocation (Miftah al-Falah) chosen excerpt here Translated by Mary Ann Koury Danner
The Key to Salvation chapter available here by Ayesha Bewley.
 Ibn 'Ata' Allah, Muslim Sufi Saint and Gift of Heaven by Abu Bakr Sirajuddin Cook.

1309 deaths
13th-century Arabs
14th-century Arabs
Asharis
Mujaddid
Egyptian Maliki scholars
Egyptian Sufis
Ancient Alexandrians
Shadhili order
Sufi mystics
Sunni fiqh scholars
Sunni Muslim scholars of Islam
Egyptian writers
13th-century Muslim scholars of Islam
13th-century jurists
14th-century jurists
Banu Judham